John Thomas Howell (November 6, 1903 – May 7, 1994) was an American botanist  and taxonomist.  He became an expert of Eriogonum (buckwheat) species, which are widely represented in the native California flora.

He was the assistant of Alice Eastwood (1859−1953), the renowned botanist and botanical collection director at the California Academy of Sciences in San Francisco, California.

Taxa named for Howell
The genera of Howelliella (in the family Plantaginaceae), Howellanthus (Scott Mountain phacelia) of the Boraginaceae family and also Johanneshowellia (Howell's buckwheat) of the family Polygonaceae, are all named in his honor.

Taxa named by Howell

See also
List of California native plants

References

American taxonomists
1903 births
1994 deaths
Botanists active in North America
People associated with the California Academy of Sciences
People from San Francisco
Scientists from California
20th-century American botanists